The football (soccer) Campeonato Brasileiro Série C 1998, the third level of Brazilian National League, was played from August 8 to December 6, 1998. The competition had 66 clubs and two of them were promoted to Série B.

Stages of the competition

First phase

Group 1

Group 2

Group 3

Group 4

Group 5

Group 6

Group 7

Group 8

Group 9

Group 10

Group 11

Second phase

Round of 16

Quarterfinals

Final stage

Notes

Sources

Campeonato Brasileiro Série C seasons
1998 in Brazilian football leagues